The 1822 Indiana gubernatorial election took place on August 5, 1822, under the provisions of the Constitution of Indiana. It was the third gubernatorial election in the State of Indiana. William Hendricks, the outgoing United States representative for Indiana's At-large congressional district, was elected without opposition, taking 100% of the vote. This remains the only uncontested gubernatorial election in the history of Indiana. The election took place concurrently with elections for lieutenant governor and members of the Indiana General Assembly.

Hendricks had represented Indiana in the United States Congress since the state's admission to the Union in 1816. The outgoing governor, Jonathan Jennings, had been reelected by an overwhelming margin in 1819 only to be sharply criticized for the poor condition of the state's finances following the Panic of 1819. Despite extremely modest expenditures, the state's expenses had exceeded its total revenue in every year since 1816; the insolvency of the state banking system, resulting in the depreciation of paper currency, further exacerbated a difficult situation. By 1822, a series of new taxes had yielded an increase in revenue, and the state's finances appeared to be improving.

Hendricks resigned his congressional seat in May, signaling his willingness to become a candidate for governor. By this time his name had already been for some months before the public. No other candidates were nominated in opposition. In the early years of statehood, the Democratic-Republican Party was dominant nationally, and the state's politics were conducted on a nonpartisan basis. Hendricks' candidacy was supported by public meetings and newspaper endorsements lauding his "able, faithful, and energetic services" to the state. The equal enthusiasm with which editors from eastern and western counties regarded his candidacy signaled the end of the geographic factionalism which had typified politics of the territorial era. On election day, Hendricks was elected without a single dissenting vote recorded.

Shortly after the election, Governor Jennings resigned to seek the congressional seat vacated by Hendricks, briefly elevating Lieutenant Governor Ratliff Boon to the governorship.

Results

Results by county
The official returns appear to have been lost. In light of the unanimity of Hendricks' election, many newspapers felt it unnecessary to publish the full results of the election.

The surviving results, as compiled in A New Nation Votes, are as follows.

Notes

References

Bibliography

Political history of Indiana
1816